Union Banks (Pagkakaisa Banks and Reefs) is a large drowned atoll in the center of Dangerous Ground in the Spratly Islands in South China Sea,  west of the Philippine coast, containing islands and reefs whose ownership remains disputed and controversial. The closest atoll is Tizard Bank,  due north of Union Banks. There are only two natural islands on the rim of the reef, Sin Cowe Island and Sin Cowe East Island.

Its total area measures .

Islands and reefs comprising Union Banks 

Union Banks consists of the following islands and reefs, clockwise starting in the southwest corner:

Key:  yellow = occupied by PRC; violet = occupied by Vietnam

<div style="float:left">

See also
List of maritime features in the Spratly Islands

References

 
Banks of the Spratly Islands